American fiddle-playing began with the early settlers who found that the small viol family instruments were portable and rugged. According to Ron Yule, "John Utie, a 1620 immigrant, settled in the North and is credited as being the first known fiddler on American soil". Early influences were Irish fiddle styles as well as Scottish and the more refined traditions of classical violin playing. Popular tunes included "Soldier's Joy", for which Robert Burns had written lyrics, and other such tunes as "Flowers of Edinburgh" and "Tamlin," which were claimed by both Scottish and Irish lineages.

Soon these tunes were Americanized; local variations developed in the Northern and Southern colonies. In contemporary American fiddle styles, the New England states are heavily influenced by all Celtic styles, including Cape Breton fiddle-playing; whereas Southern or "Dixie" fiddle styles have tended to develop their own traditions, which emphasize double stops and in some instances the incorporation of dance calls or simple lyrics.

Contemporary fusionist trends

In a radical departure from tradition, groups such as Trio Chipontepec are cropping up at American fiddle festivals. Rock is fusing with country, jazz with rock, and classical violinists are retooling in an era characterized by home recording studios and the easy availability of new media such as MP3 downloads.

Fiddle playing distinguished from violin playing

Some folk fiddlers distinguish "fiddle" from "violin", though this is far from universal - many classical violinists refer to their "fiddle". Nevertheless, a few common differences may be observed;

Instrument
Generally, the setup of the instruments is different:

 Fiddle bridge top may be slightly flatter
 String action height may be lower
 Strings more often steel than synthetic or gut
 Fiddle more commonly set up with pickup
 Fiddle more commonly set up with four fine tuners; violinists more likely to use a single tailpiece E tuner

Playing technique

Fiddle playing generally avoids vibrato except for occasional slow tempo pieces and even then uses less vibrato. Shorter bow strokes are also consistent with the fiddle players' tendency to use less legato and more detache bow strokes. Some, but not all, styles use double stops and open tunings. Trick fiddling is employed, often built upon cross bowing technique such as used in Orange Blossom Special or Beaumont Rag.
Bowing by fiddle players is quite different in that they may intentionally grip the frog in a crude manner and typically choke up on the bow. See for instance Rhiannon Giddens of the Carolina Chocolate Drops Massachusetts performance of Genuine Negro Jig in May 2010.

Fiddle repertoire distinguished

Fiddle players tend to play fiddle "tunes" rather than sonatas and other classical types of compositions. There are exceptions. For instance, partitas have been popular with fiddle players, particularly since publication of the Open House CD by Kevin Burke, an Irish style player based in Portland, Oregon. Fiddles are typically associated with country and other genres of popular music while violins are usually associated with classical and other genres of art music.

Types of tunes

 Reels
 Hornpipes
 Polkas
 Jigs
 Slip Jigs
 Double Jigs
 Waltzes
 Songs with lyrics

Canonical Tunes

Orange Blossom Special 

Also known as "OBS", Orange Blossom Special exploits the capacity of fiddle or violin to imitate various mechanical tones. Authorship is controversial.

The Devil Went Down to Georgia 
The canonical American fiddle tune, "The Devil Went Down to Georgia" was written by Charlie Daniels as an interpretation the "Lonesome Fiddle Blues" by Vassar Clements and has been covered innumerable times. Although classified as country rock, the tune uses licks based on old-time fiddle playing and rock guitar riffs. Unlike most old-time playing, the instrument ranges high up the neck, exploiting both the legendary association of the fiddle as "the devil's instrument" and the intensity of rapid sixteenth or thirty-second notes. These effects are achieved through rapid detache bowing bordering on outright tremolo. The motif of a deal with the Devil may have been influenced by Cross Road Blues, by Delta blues singer Robert Johnson.

Blues fiddle

According to London-based music writer Chris Haigh, fiddle  " was among the primary instruments used by the rural blacks..." He contends that by  1930 over 50 different black blues fiddle players had recordings. Many musicians who were guitar stars also played fiddle including:

 Lonnie Johnson
 Big Bill Broonzy
 Clarence "Gatemouth" Brown

Blues fiddle uses the pentatonic blues scale to create riffs for breaks and over guitar chords typically in the standard blues progression. Vibrato is not often used, although may occasionally be used in an exaggerated manner for special effect.

Blues fiddle discography
Violin, Sing The Blues For Me

 VIOLIN, SING THE BLUES FOR ME
African-American Fiddlers  1926-1949
Old Hat CD-1002

Appalachian Old time fiddle

Old time fiddle uses a profusion of double stops and many players typically tune their instruments in "open tunings" or cross tunings. The set ups often include flattened bridges and in some cases no chin rest. The most popular tuning ia AEAE for the key of A, but the instrument can be down tuned to GDGD, which may put less tension on the neck when playing solo. ADAE is also popular for the key of D, and standard (GDAE) is often used for G. Some of the earliest popular repertoire includes "Turkey in the Straw," "Arkansas Traveler," "Billy in the Lowground." Accompanying instruments include washboard, jug bass, banjo, dulcimer, guitar, and occasionally kazoo.

According to some sources, old time music is actually the "early recorded country music of the 1920s and 1930s, particularly of the southeastern states" thus narrowing the definition considerably. Nevertheless, a broader definition usually prevails which incorporates unrecorded music with roots long before radio transmission and sound recording were invented. Within old time music there are regional subgenres, such as the Deep South and Appalachia, where fiddle music is often intertwined with cultural phenomena such as coal mining.

A comprehensive review of old time fiddle styles was written by David Reiner and Peter Anick and published in 1989.

Bluegrass fiddle

Bluegrass music originated in the person of Bill Monroe. According to Haigh, "Monroe always considered the fiddle to be the key instrument of bluegrass".

 Chubby Wise Played with Monroe. Also a Texas Swing player 
 Byron Berline a bluegrass player, has appeared with the Rolling Stones, Gram Parsons and The Flying Burrito Brothers
 Richard Greene Played with Monroe. Classical training, old time. Band: Seatrain. tric violin. COMPOSITION: "What if Mozart had played with Bill Monroe; a concerto for violin and orchestra"

Cajun fiddle
According to Ron Yule, "Louisiana fiddling had its birth roots in Europe, with fiddling being noted as early as the 15th century in Scotland." The most widely known Cajun fiddler is Doug Kershaw.

Zydeco music is closely related.

Rock fiddle

Rock fiddle, like rock music in general, owes much to American blues. Incorporation of fiddle or violin into rock, as with jazz, has been a slow process, resisted by some critics as an"unlikeliest and perverse misuse of an instrument". Rock has roots in folk music particularly the American folk revival of the 1960s, and thus as a matter of usage some writers refer to "rock fiddle" when discussing playing by classically trained musicians who join rock bands and thus import classical style rather than fiddle style into their playing.

 Papa John Creach (Jefferson Airplane, Jefferson Starship, Hot Tuna) played in a style more closely approaching true fiddle as opposed to violinistic style.
 Sugar Cane Harris (violin,technically), played with John Mayall & the Bluesbreakers, John Lee Hooker, Little Richard and  Johnny Otis.
 Jerry Goodman (violin, technically), with Mahavishnu Orchestra's album Birds of Fire.
 Scarlet Rivera (violin, technically), played with Bob Dylan on "Hurricane".
 David LaFlamme (violin, technically) (born Gary Posie), It's A Beautiful Day, also performed with Jerry Garcia, Janis Joplin, and Dan Hicks.

Rock violinists often use solid body electric violins to reduce feedback. Rock is an international phenomenon and is consequently influenced by cross fertilizations from rock players such as Ashley MacIsaac Nevertheless, American rockers continue to experiment. For instance, eclectic rocker Natalie Stovall, a graduate of Berkelee Conservatory, covers Led Zeppelin, AC/DC, Michael Jackson, Lenny Kravitz, The White Stripes, Lynyrd Skynyrd, Jimi Hendrix, all the while alternating between standard rock vocals and fiddle/violin riffs.

Other rock fiddle or violin players include

 Byron Berline a bluegrass player, has appeared with The Rolling Stones, Gram Parsons and The Flying Burrito Brothers
 Rufus Thibodeaux (Neil Young)
 John Cale of The Velvet Underground notable tracks include "Heroin"

American jazz fiddle

Jazz playing on the fiddle is often called jazz violin but there are some instances in which "jazz fiddle" is discussed. For instance Mel Bay contributor Martin Norgard presents jazz fiddle in numerous media (book, website). Nevertheless, instructional jazz playing was preceded by  the highly influential 1992 Oak Publications volume Jazz Violin" by Matt Glaser and Stephane Grapelli. The topic is indeed covered on the Wikipedia online encyclopedia at the article page entitled Jazz violin. Australian jazz player Ian Cooper is presented as a violinist. Dutch eclectic player Tim Kliphuis presents his jazz instructional material as "Jazz Swing Violin Fiddle" but his website quotes the Glasgow Herald review which denominates hims as a "splendid young...violinist".

Texas swing 

This music, usually considered to be synonymous with Western swing, is bona fide fiddle music and is deeply intertwined with country and folk music as played by Willie Nelson, Merle Haggard, Vince Gill, Dale Watson, the Wheel's Jason Roberts, Jesse Dayton, and Garrison Keillor. A well-known example of this music is "Faded Love", which despite some controversy is generally attributed to Bob Wills.:*Mark O'Connor is a legendary performer who also plays bluegrass and jazz but got started as a youth contender in fiddle contests.

New England, "Down East," Yankee, or Boston fiddle 

One of the most prominent examples of the New England fiddle tradition was Maine's Mellie Dunham, who was a sensation in his day. Today New England fiddle playing is exemplified by Rounder Records artist Frank Ferrel. He refers to the style as "Down East" in his volume Boston Fiddle. Unlike other fiddle traditions, piano accompaniment is common, and, he notes occasionally saxophone or clarinet would join in. Another feature is frequent use of minor keys particularly G minor and also the "flat keys" of F Major and B flat Major, which are not typically used in Old Time and other indigenous music traditions.  Ferrell traces his roots into the 1800s Boston Scottish and Irish cultures as typified in musicians such as William Bradbury Ryan. Like all Celtic American fiddle traditions, his is influenced by the publication of Chief O'Neil's massive directory of fiddle tunes in 1903  Thus, Ferrel and others in the North East tradition use the full panoply of Irish fiddle ornamentation.

 Bowed Triple
The Cut
 The Double Cut
 The Long Roll
 The Short Roll
 The Slide
Other influences include Scottish fiddling and Cape Breton style, which has its own blend of Celtic traditions which include also Normandy styles.

Canadian and other international influence

American fiddle traditions are deeply influenced by international influence from numerous immigrations and ordinary commerce particularly from Anglo-Celtic and Canadian sources. Québécois French, Cape Breton, Nova Scotia. 
 Folk music tradition but has distinct features found only in the Western hemisphere  This influence is largely due to immigration and cross-border commerce. 
Some observers categorize Maritime influence as a cosmopolitan trend of its own blending otherwise distinct styles which outlines several influences on what they call Northeastern Fiddling Styles: Cape Breton, French-Canadian (Québécois) and Maritime.

Scottish style American fiddlers
Brittany Haas
Hanneke Cassel
Jeremy Kittel
Bonnie Rideout
Laura Risk

See also
Fiddle
 Banjo
 Appalachian dulcimer
 John Lomax, musicologist
 Mark O'Connor, a major influence
 List of fiddlers
 Canadian fiddle
 Cajun fiddle
 Scottish fiddling
 Irish fiddle

References

Further reading
North American Fiddle Music: a research and information guide by Drew Beisswenger (2011). Routledge. .

External links

 The Digital Library of Appalachia

American folk music
American styles of music
Appalachian culture
Celtic music
Country music genres
Culture of the Southern United States
Fiddle music
Music genres
Old-time music
Violins